Obereopsis pseudannulicornis is a species of beetle in the family Cerambycidae. It was described by Stephan von Breuning in 1957. It is known from Borneo.

References

pseudannulicornis
Beetles described in 1957